Angiopoietin 1 is a type of angiopoietin and is encoded by the gene ANGPT1.

Angiopoietins are proteins with important roles in vascular development and angiogenesis. All angiopoietins bind with similar affinity to an endothelial cell-specific tyrosine-protein kinase receptor. The protein encoded by this gene is a secreted glycoprotein that activates the receptor by inducing its tyrosine phosphorylation. It plays a critical role in mediating reciprocal interactions between the endothelium and surrounding matrix and mesenchyme. The protein also contributes to blood vessel maturation and stability, and may be involved in early development of the heart. During pregnancy, angiopoietins act complementary to the VEGF system and contribute to endothelial cell survival and the remodeling of vessels. Few studies have examined the role of angiopoietins in human pregnancy complications like preeclampsia and intrauterine growth restriction (IUGR).

A knockout model of ANGPT1 was introduced in mice embryos. Results showed that embryos began to appear abnormal by day 11 and were dead by day 12.5 of pregnancy. The embryos showed prominent defects in endocardial and myocardial development as well as a less complex vascular network.

Interactions
Angiopoietin 1 has been shown to interact with TEK tyrosine kinase.

Placental Malaria 
Recently, studies in malaria-endemic areas suggest that placental malaria (PM) may be associated with a dysregulation in angiopoietins. Increased levels of angiopoietin-1 appear to be associated with a decrease in placental weight and placental barrier thickness in women infected with Plasmodium (the causative agent of malaria). In a mouse model of PM, Plasmodium infection of pregnant mice led to decreased angiopoietin-1, increased angiopoietin-2, and an elevated ratio of angiopoietin-2/angiopoietin-1 in the placenta. This suggests that angiopoietin levels could be clinically significant biomarkers to identify mothers infected with PM.

See also
 Angiopoietin

References

Further reading

External links